The Firearms (Amendment) (No. 2) Act 1997 was the second of two Acts of the Parliament of the United Kingdom from 1997 that amended the regulation of firearms within Great Britain. It was introduced by the newly elected Labour government of Tony Blair. The first Act was the Firearms (Amendment) Act 1997.

Background
The act was created in response to the Snowdrop Petition following the Dunblane Massacre. The previous Conservative government had exceeded the recommendations of the Cullen Report and introduced the Firearms (Amendment) Act 1997 that banned "high calibre" handguns, greater than .22 calibre (5.6 mm). This new (No. 2) Act further prohibited the private possession of all cartridge handguns, regardless of calibre.

The only handguns still allowed following the ban were:

 Antique and muzzle-loading black-powder guns
 Firearms of historic interest whose ammunition is no longer available  ("Section 7.1" firearms)
 Firearms of historic interest with current calibres ("Section 7.3" firearms)
 Air pistols
 Firearms which fall outside the Home Office definition of "small firearms".
 Pistols used by hunters for humane dispatch

The Act does not extend to Northern Ireland, where firearms regulations differ due to the Troubles. Northern Ireland law allows pistols for use as personal protection weapons, mainly by retired police or prison officers, but also prominent figures who were considered at risk. It also does not extend to Crown Dependencies such as the Channel Islands of Isle of Man, where handguns are still used in target sports.

See also
Firearms regulation in the United Kingdom

Notes

References

External links

Firearm laws
United Kingdom Acts of Parliament 1997
Gun politics in the United Kingdom
Dunblane massacre